The Annals of Intensive Care is a monthly open access peer-reviewed medical journal covering intensive care medicine. It was established in 2011. The editor-in-chief is Jean-Louis Teboul. It is the official journal of the French Intensive Care Society and is published by Springer Science+Business Media.

Abstracting and indexing
The journal is abstracted and indexed in:

References

External links 
 
 French Intensive Care Society (Société de Réanimation de Langue Française)

Emergency medicine journals
English-language journals
Monthly journals
Springer Science+Business Media academic journals
Publications established in 2011
Open access journals